Them vs. You vs. Me is the fourth full-length studio album from Canadian alternative rock band Finger Eleven. The album was initially rumoured to be titled Sense of a Spark.  The album was released on March 6, 2007. It reached number 31 on the US Billboard 200 and number two on the Canadian Albums Chart, making it the band's most successful album on either chart. As of May 17, 2008, the album has sold 650,342 copies in the United States and has been certified Gold by the RIAA.

The album won the 2008 Juno Award for Rock Album of the Year.

Critical reception

AllMusic senior editor Stephen Thomas Erlewine was conflicted with the album, praising the flourishes of disco-rock and funk in tracks like "Paralyzer" and "Lost My Way" but felt there wasn't enough of it in "a collection of otherwise colorless but capable by-the-book alt-rock", concluding with: "So, the variety of rhythms, along with the increasing emphasis on acoustic-based power ballads, gives Them vs. You vs. Me the greatest musical variety of any Finger Eleven record, but they remain boxed in by their good intentions: they remain a group that's too polite to dislike but too well-mannered to remember." Chris Willman of Entertainment Weekly said of the band's change in musical direction throughout the record, "Mostly, though, their newfound malleability results in cravenly radio-baiting ballads like "I'll Keep Your Memory Vague" — a title that may also describe listeners' reaction to this forgettable fare."

Track listing

Bonus tracks
"Change the World [Acoustic Mix]" – 3:43 (Canada deluxe version)
"Sacrifice [B-Side]" – 3:45 (Canada and UK deluxe version)
"Them vs. You vs. Me" – 4:12 (Canada and UK deluxe version)
"Falling On [Live]" – 3:18 (Canada deluxe version)
"Paralyzer [Live]" – 3:34 (Canada deluxe version)

Charts

Weekly charts

Year-end charts

Singles

References

2007 albums
Albums produced by Johnny K
Finger Eleven albums
Wind-up Records albums
Juno Award for Rock Album of the Year albums